Veeranna is a 2005 Indian Tamil-language drama film directed by B. Kalanithi. The film stars Napoleon, Anamika, Preethi Varma, and Sheela. It was released on 18 December 2005.

Plot
Mariappan (Napoleon) is the faithful servant of Rajeshwari (Sheela), whereas Rajeshwari spreads terror among the villagers. Mariappan's son Veeranna (Napoleon), a military officer, is back to his village and he tries to be quieter than before. His cousin Vennila is deeply in love with him. One day, children drunk the river's water and they fell ill because of a ladder factory which threw wastewater in the river. As a responsible citizen, Veeranna files a complaint against the owner of the company Rajeshwari. In addition to this, Veeranna saves Rajeshwari's daughter Aishwarya (Preethi Varma), who was naked, from drowning. Rajeshwari orders him to leave the village on the spot but he refuses and he marries Aishwarya. What transpires later forms the crux of the story.

Cast

Napoleon as Mariappan and Veeranna
Anamika as Vennila
Preethi Varma as Aishwarya
Sheela as Rajeshwari
Vadivelu as Pazhanisamy
Manivannan as Alagarsamy
R. Sundarrajan
Vennira Aadai Moorthy as Panju
Pandu
Balaji as Mandhira Moorthy
Vadivukkarasi as Janaki
Crane Manohar
Scissor Manohar
Halwa Vasu
Durairaj
Singamuthu
V. K. T. Balan
Charles
A. Arichandran
Anjali Devi
Poorvaja
Praveena
John Babu in a guest appearance

Soundtrack

The film score and the soundtrack were composed by Soundaryan. The soundtrack, released in 2005, features 5 tracks with lyrics written by Muthulingam and Viveka.

References

2005 films
2000s Tamil-language films
Indian action drama films
2005 action drama films